21K can mean:

 A half marathon
 The NextStrain clade identifier for SARS-CoV-2 Omicron variant
 21-karat gold